was a Japanese politician of the Democratic Party of Japan, a member of the House of Representatives in the Diet (national legislature). A native of Tajima, Fukushima and graduate of Waseda University, he was elected to the first of his two terms in the assembly of Fukushima Prefecture in 1959 and then to the House of Representatives for the first time in 1969 as an independent. He later joined the Liberal Democratic Party and eventually the DPJ. According to The Economist, he "represented agriculture interests in the Diet".

References

External links
Official website 

|-

|-

|-

1932 births
Democratic Party of Japan politicians
Government ministers of Japan
Liberal Democratic Party (Japan) politicians
2020 deaths
Members of the House of Representatives (Japan)
Politicians from Fukushima Prefecture
Waseda University alumni
21st-century Japanese politicians